The Tuvan Internationale is a socialist song set to a Tuvan traditional melody. It was the national anthem of the Tuvan People's Republic from 1921 to 1944. It is often incorrectly listed as the Tuvan language version of "The Internationale" despite the two songs having almost nothing in common aside from similar names. With a different melody and different lyrics, the only similarity between the two songs is the fact that they are about a Workers' International. Even then, however, The Internationale is about the First International whereas the Tuvan Internationale is about the Third International.

When the revolutions after the First World War came to a close, communists managed to gain power in only three countries: the Soviet Union, Tuva and Mongolia. After the Soviet Union was formed, it adopted The Internationale as its anthem. In honour of this, composers in Tuva and Mongolia created the Tuvan Internationale and Mongol Internationale. The Mongol Internationale later served as the national anthem of Mongolia from 1924 to 1950.

The song was included on the Huun-Huur-Tu album "60 Horses In My Herd. Old Songs And Tunes Of Tuva".

Lyrics

See also
Tooruktug Dolgay Tangdym
Mongol Internationale

Notes

References

Asian anthems
Comintern
Tuva
Year of song missing
Anthems of Tuva